Then One Day was a Canadian indie pop band from Montreal, Quebec, who were active from 1983 to 1987.

Origins
Then One Day was formed in 1983 by guitarist André Allore, bassist Paul Gantous and drummer James Rennie. Vocalist Terry Armstrong was recruited to round complete the quartet.

The band released the EP, Style Life, in 1986 which was recorded at Silent Sound Studios in Montreal and contributed to the Listen 2 compilation of Montreal music, on VOT records.  They were one of the prominent pop bands on the Montreal music scene in the mid 1980s.  In 1987 the band were preparing to tour with new material which didn't evolve.

Then One Day played their last show at Montreal's Club Soda in 1987, with the unforeseen announcement of the band splitting up. 
(Joe Vidyo)

Personnel

Lineup
André Allore – Guitar, Vocals (1983–1987)
Terry Armstrong – Lead Vocals (1983–1987)
Paul Gantous – Bass Guitar (1983–1987)
James Rennie – Drums, Vocals (1983–1987)

Discography 
 Live at Station 10 (1985)
 Style Life (1986)
 Listen 2 – A Faze Compilation (1986)

Track listing – "Live at Station 10"

Track listing – "Style Life"

Track listing – "Listen 2 – A Faze Compilation"

See also

Music of Montreal
Canadian rock
List of Canadian musicians
List of bands from Canada
:Category:Canadian musical groups

External links
 Discogs
 Discogs
 Discogs

References

Musical groups from Montreal
Canadian indie pop groups
Musical groups established in 1983
Musical groups disestablished in 1987
1983 establishments in Quebec
1987 disestablishments in Quebec